The 2001–02 Interliga season was the third season of the multi-national ice hockey league. Eight teams participated in the league, and Olimpija from Slovenia have won the championship.

Regular season

Play-offs

Semi-finals
Jesenice (4) – Alba Volán Székesfehérvár (1): 7–4 (1–0, 4–2, 2–2)
Alba Volán Székesfehérvár – Jesenice: 6–1 (1–0, 2–0, 3–1)
Olimpija (3) – Dunaújvárosi Acélbikák (2): 4–2 (1–0, 1–1, 2–1)
Dunaújvárosi Acélbikák – Olimpija: 4–3 n.P. (1–1, 1–1, 2–0, 0–1)

Final
Olimpija (3) – Alba Volán Székesfehérvár (1): 4–1 (1–0, 1–1, 2–0)
Alba Volán Székesfehérvár – Olimpija: 5–3 n.P. (1–1, 3–0, 1–1, 0–1)

Placing round

Medveščak (8) – Dubnica: 5–7 (1–3, 2–3, 2–1)
Dubnica – Medveščak: 10–4 (3–0, 4–2, 3–2)
Vojvodina (7) – Slavija (6): 2–4 (1–2, 1–2, 0–0)
Slavija – Vojvodina: 5–3 (2–1, 1–0, 2–2)
 
3rd place
Jesenice – Dunaújvárosi Acélbikák: 2–0 (0–0, 1–0, 1–0)
Dunaújvárosi Acélbikák – Jesenice: 4–4 (2–1, 0–1, 2–2)

5th place
Slavija – Dubnica: 3–1 (2–1, 0–0, 1–0)
Dubnica – Slavija : 5–0 (1–0, 3–0, 1–0)

7th place
Medveščak – Vojvodina: 5–2 (2–0, 2–0, 1–2)
Vojvodina – Medveščak: 6–1 (2–0, 1–1, 3–0)

Final ranking
Olimpija
Alba Volán Székesfehérvár
Jesenice
Dunaújvárosi Acélbikák
Dubnica
Slavija
Vojvodina
Medveščak

External links
Season on www.hockeyarchives.info

Interliga (1999–2007) seasons
2001–02 in European ice hockey leagues
Inter